The 2014 International V8 Supercars Championship (often simplified to the 2014 V8 Supercars Championship) was an FIA-sanctioned international motor racing series for V8 Supercars. It was the sixteenth running of the V8 Supercars Championship and the eighteenth series in which V8 Supercars have contested the premier Australian touring car title.

Volvo entered the championship with a factory team in a collaboration with Garry Rogers Motorsport and its motorsport arm, Polestar Racing. The team raced the Volvo S60 under the Volvo Polestar Racing brand. It was the first time that Volvo has competed in the Australian Touring Car Championship since Robbie Francevic won the title driving a Volvo 240T in 1986.

Jamie Whincup successfully defended his drivers' championship, securing a record sixth title at Phillip Island, surpassing the previous record of five held by Ian Geoghegan, Dick Johnson and Mark Skaife. His team, Triple Eight Race Engineering, also retained the teams' championship. Whincup and co-driver Paul Dumbrell won the Endurance Cup, taking wins at the Sandown 500 and the Gold Coast 600.

Teams and drivers
Twenty-five cars contested the full 2014 championship, down from twenty-eight in 2013.

Team changes

Dick Johnson Racing returned the Racing Entitlement Contract (REC) it had leased from Triple F Racing for the previous two seasons. After unsuccessfully trying to secure sponsorship for a 2014 campaign, Triple F Racing returned the REC to V8 Supercars management.
Garry Rogers Motorsport changed manufacturers, switching from racing Holden Commodores to become a factory-supported Volvo team, racing the second generation S60. The cars were powered by a modified version of Volvo's Yamaha-designed 4.4-litre B8444S V8 engine.
James Rosenberg Racing ended its association with Erebus Motorsport and became a customer of Walkinshaw Racing. After exploring the possibility of securing additional RECs to expand to a four-car team, Erebus downsized to two cars.
Lucas Dumbrell Motorsport scaled back to a single car operation, returning one of its RECs to V8 Supercars management.
Tekno Autosports returned to operating as a single-car team. Shane van Gisbergen's car was entered under the REC the team owns, with the one leased from Paul Morris Motorsport for 2012 and 2013 being returned and sold to Dick Johnson Racing.
Tony D'Alberto Racing was unable to find sufficient sponsorship to compete in the series, so sold its car and equipment to Walkinshaw Racing, and returned its REC to V8 Supercars management.

Driver changes
Tony D'Alberto was unable to raise sufficient sponsorship to compete full-time in 2014.
Robert Dahlgren joined Garry Rogers Motorsport, replacing Alexandre Prémat. Dahlgren had previously raced a Volvo S60 in the Scandinavian Touring Car Championship with Garry Rogers Motorsport's partner Polestar Racing. Prémat rejoined the team for the endurance races.
Will Davison left Ford Performance Racing to join Erebus Motorsport, replacing Maro Engel.
Dean Fiore, who drove for Lucas Dumbrell Motorsport in 2013, was unable to secure funding to continue racing full-time in 2014.
Russell Ingall was not offered a contract extension by Walkinshaw Racing, and moved to Lucas Dumbrell Motorsport.
Chaz Mostert replaced Will Davison at Ford Performance Racing. He had been contracted to the team in 2013 before he was loaned out to drive for Dick Johnson Racing mid-season.
Nick Percat made his full-time season debut, driving a car entered by James Rosenberg Racing and run by Walkinshaw Racing.
Jack Perkins returned to the championship on a full-time basis for the first time since 2009, replacing Alex Davison at Charlie Schwerkolt Racing. With the team electing to take Perkins, Davison was left without a seat.
Scott Pye and David Wall joined Dick Johnson Racing from Lucas Dumbrell Motorsport and Britek Motorsport respectively, replacing Tim Blanchard and Chaz Mostert.
Tim Slade left Erebus Motorsport to replace Russell Ingall at Walkinshaw Racing.
Jonathon Webb elected not to contest the 2014 season full-time, focusing instead on his business interests. His family's Tekno Autosports team therefore did not to take up an option to purchase its leased REC from Paul Morris Motorsport. Webb co-drove for the team during the endurance races.
Dale Wood, the reigning Dunlop Series champion, replaced David Wall at Britek Motorsport. Wood had previously contested the first half of the 2009 season with Kelly Racing.

Season calendar
The 2014 calendar was released on 23 September 2013.

Calendar changes
The series did not return to the Circuit of the Americas in the United States. The championship returned to Sydney Motorsport Park for the Sydney Motorsport Park 400, having last raced at the circuit in 2012. The event used the Gardner Circuit configuration. The addition of the Sydney Motorsport Park event in August saw the Winton 400 move from August to April.

Format changes
There were two formats used for events outside of the Endurance Cup. "Super Street" events were held at the Clipsal 500, Townsville and Sydney 500 events, with a pair of 125-kilometre races held on Saturday and a 250-kilometre race held on Sunday. All other events featured the "Super Sprint" format, with two 100-kilometre races held on Saturday and a single 200-kilometre race held on Sunday, though the Pukekohe event included an additional 100-kilometre race held on Friday. The Sandown 500, Bathurst 1000 and the Gold Coast 600 – races counting towards the Endurance Cup – retained their respective event formats of a single 500-kilometre, 1000-kilometre and two 300-kilometre races. The 60/60 Sprint format, introduced in 2013, was discontinued.

A number of races. including the first race of the Clipsal 500, were held at twilight, coinciding with prime time television broadcasts. The last event held under lights was the opening round of the 1997 season, held at Calder Park Raceway.

Rule changes
2014 saw practice sessions become time-certain, whereby the session finished after a designated amount of time with no allowance for session interruptions, such as red flags. Qualifying sessions run on the same day as each other were allowed a fifteen-minute extension shared between the sessions if required. Additional practice sessions were held at the Winton, Queensland Raceway and Sydney Motorsport Park events.

The 2014 season saw changes to the regulations regarding abandoned starts which require an additional formation lap and for the suspension and resumption of races in the case of a red flag. The procedure used for safety car restarts was also revised. Previously, the lead car controlled the pace until the safety car entered the pit lane at which point the lead car could accelerate. The new rules dictated that the lead car must maintain a speed between fifty and sixty kilometres-per-hour until it reached the "Acceleration Zone" located before the control line – mimicking the restart procedure used for the second half of the 60/60 Sprint format used in 2013 – at which point the driver could accelerate and racing resumed. This was in response to several incidents where the lead car accelerated too early on the safety car restart, most notably at the 2013 Austin 400 where Fabian Coulthard, Jamie Whincup and Craig Lowndes were penalised for the infringement.

Following the Clipsal 500, where Jason Bright's car had rolled following a safety car restart, the restart procedure was reviewed and changed for the second event of the championship. The Acceleration Zone was lengthened and the lead-up speed was raised to be between sixty and eighty kilometres-per-hour. Drivers were no longer allowed to overtake prior to the control line. The safety car restart procedure was eventually changed back to the 2013 system, with Todd Kelly stating that the 2014 procedure had been difficult to manage for the drivers.

Cars were required to take on a specified amount of fuel in the Sunday race at all events bar the Endurance Cup events.

Event summaries

Clipsal 500 Adelaide

Craig Lowndes left the first event of the championship leading the points standings ahead of Fabian Coulthard and Shane van Gisbergen. Lowndes' teammate Jamie Whincup won the first race of the weekend ahead of Lowndes and van Gisbergen. Lowndes then won the second race ahead of Scott McLaughlin—in a strong début for the Volvo S60—and Whincup. James Courtney lost the passenger-side front door of his car after contact with Lee Holdsworth. Courtney recovered to take the win in the third race ahead of Lowndes and van Gisbergen. The third race saw a number of incidents occur. Will Davison made heavy contact with the wall at turn eight after a touch from James Moffat, sustaining significant damage to his car. After the safety car period to recover Davison's car, Jason Bright rolled at the Senna Chicane following contact with Garth Tander and Tim Slade with Holdsworth, Scott Pye and Chaz Mostert also suffering significant damage. Nick Percat also crashed at turn eight while running third in the closing stages. Controversial penalties were awarded to van Gisbergen and Rick Kelly, who were alleged to be travelling too quickly at the first safety car restart, and to Whincup, whose car controller was deemed to have worked on the car during his second pit stop. Whincup made contact with Michael Caruso while making his way back through the field, forcing both cars to pit for a lengthy period.

Tyrepower Tasmania 400

Triple Eight Race Engineering dominated the second event of the championship. Jamie Whincup took pole position and Craig Lowndes qualified in second for all three races, though Lowndes was disqualified from the second qualifying session due to a technical infringement. Whincup won the first race, after a controversial incident with Lowndes while the pair battled for the lead, ahead of James Courtney and Mark Winterbottom. Todd and Rick Kelly both failed to finish after suspension and brake failures respectively. Whincup also won the second race, ahead of Winterbottom and Fabian Coulthard, while Lowndes made his way from the back of the grid to fifth place. Lowndes recovered to take a strong win in the third race, with Whincup finishing second and Courtney third. Will Davison finished fourth, equalling Erebus Motorsport's best result in the series. Lowndes maintained his lead in the championship, while Whincup moved up from seventh to second, 70 points behind his teammate.

Winton 400

The Winton 400 saw three different drivers and manufacturers win each of the three races. Fabian Coulthard scored pole for both of the Saturday races and went on to win the first race ahead of Shane van Gisbergen and Dale Wood, who achieved his first podium finish in the series. Russell Ingall, after fitting new tyres during a safety car period, received a drive-through penalty while on course for a podium finish, leading to him labelling the race stewards as "peanuts" in a post-race interview. Lee Holdsworth gave Erebus Motorsport and Mercedes-Benz their first victories in the series by winning the second race ahead of Mark Winterbottom and Coulthard. Scott McLaughlin took his maiden pole position in qualifying for the Sunday race but he was one of five drivers to be given a drive-through penalty for speeding in the pit lane. Winterbottom took his and Ford's first win of the year in front of James Courtney and Tim Slade. Craig Lowndes held on to the championship lead despite a troublesome weekend, with Winterbottom moving up to second, 28 points off the lead.

ITM 500 Auckland

Mark Winterbottom won the Jason Richards Memorial Trophy after dominating the weekend in New Zealand. The 2013 Jason Richards Memorial Trophy winner, Jason Bright, started the event strongly by taking pole for the first race and going on to win after early leader Jamie Whincup had steering problems. Shane van Gisbergen and Craig Lowndes completed the podium, while David Wall was put out for the rest of the weekend after contact with Chaz Mostert at the final corner caused his car to make heavy contact with the wall. Winterbottom won the first of the Saturday races ahead of polesitter James Courtney and Mostert. Van Gisbergen won the second Saturday race, holding off a late charge from Winterbottom, with Scott McLaughlin in third after starting from pole. McLaughlin again took pole for the Sunday race but was beaten by Winterbottom in the race, with Mostert finishing third for the second time during the weekend. Tim Slade had qualified on the front row, but his car had a clutch problem on the formation lap, causing an aborted start and forcing him to start from the pit lane. With Lowndes struggling during the weekend, Winterbottom left the event with a 107-point lead in the championship.

Perth 400

Scott McLaughlin won the first race of the Perth 400, giving Volvo its first win in the series since 1986. Fabian Coulthard and Chaz Mostert completed the podium. Triple Eight Race Engineering returned to form after a run of poor results, with Craig Lowndes and Jamie Whincup finishing first and third respectively in the second race, split by championship leader Mark Winterbottom. Mostert took his first victory for Ford Performance Racing by winning the third race ahead of Lowndes and Winterbottom. All cars run by the Holden Racing Team and Erebus Motorsport suffered punctures, forcing their drivers down the order. Lowndes trimmed Winterbottom's championship lead to 101 points, while Whincup moved past James Courtney for fourth.

Skycity Triple Crown

Triple Eight Race Engineering dominated the first two races of the Skycity Triple Crown, with Jamie Whincup taking pole position for both races and leading home Craig Lowndes in each. Shane van Gisbergen and Fabian Coulthard completed the podium in each race. Lowndes took pole for the third race, which saw a variety of strategies used by the teams. After using an alternate strategy and starting on hard tyres, as opposed to soft tyres used by most of the frontrunners, Lowndes and Whincup attempted to move forwards in the middle section of the race. Lowndes made contact with the rear of Chaz Mostert's car, puncturing his tyre and dropping him down the order. Mark Winterbottom led in the closing stages, having run soft tyres for the entire race, with Whincup and van Gisbergen behind on fresher soft tyres. Whincup let van Gisbergen through to try to catch Winterbottom but he was not able to do so and Winterbottom held on for the win. With Lowndes finishing seventeenth, Winterbottom extended his championship lead to 161 points.

Castrol Townsville 500

The seventh event in Townsville saw Craig Lowndes lose ground in the championship race. On the opening lap of race one, Lowndes made contact with both Garth Tander and James Courtney before being spun into the wall by Will Davison, failing to finish a race for the first time since 2012. Lowndes and Davison both received points penalties for their roles in each incident, while Todd Kelly also received a points penalty for an incident with Jack Perkins. Lowndes' teammate Jamie Whincup capitalised to win the race ahead of a recovering Tander and Davison. Tander went on to win the second race with Courtney in second place, while polesitter Fabian Coulthard finished third. Lowndes had more problems on Sunday, with a grid penalty dropping him from first to third on the grid, gifting pole to Jason Bright, before an overheating engine dropped him to twenty-third position. Whincup won again, with Tander in second and Shane van Gisbergen in third. Championship leader Mark Winterbottom qualified poorly during the weekend, but managed to finish in the top ten in two of the races to maintain his series lead, with Whincup moving up to second, 96 points behind, and Lowndes dropping to sixth behind Coulthard, van Gisbergen and Courtney.

Coates Hire Ipswich 400

The Ipswich 400 saw the championship lead change hands, with Jamie Whincup moving ahead of Mark Winterbottom. Whincup won both of the Saturday races ahead of his teammate Craig Lowndes. Lowndes had started from pole in the first race but Whincup passed him towards the end of the race to take the win, with Scott McLaughlin finishing behind the pair. McLaughlin, from pole, and Michael Caruso led Whincup and Lowndes for most of the second race. Caruso attempted to pass McLaughlin, but he nudged the Volvo into a spin and received a drive-through penalty. Whincup then held off Lowndes to win the race, with Chaz Mostert finishing third. The Sunday race saw James Moffat take his first career pole position and the first for Nissan since the company returned to the series. James Courtney won the race after starting from second on the grid, with Lowndes in second and Mostert third. Scott Pye scored a career-best result with fourth. Moffat finished fifth after going off the track while attempting to pass Mostert on the final lap. Whincup finished sixth, which was enough to take the championship lead after a tyre puncture for Winterbottom dropped him to twenty-second place.

Sydney Motorsport Park 400

Jamie Whincup took his 58th career pole position in the first race of the Sydney Motorsport Park 400, breaking Peter Brock's long-standing record of 57, while Scott McLaughlin took pole for the second race. The two Saturday races were the first championship races in nearly three years to be held in wet conditions, with Shane van Gisbergen taking both wins. Garth Tander and Craig Lowndes completed the podium in the first race, with Chaz Mostert and Whincup taking second and third respectively in the second. McLaughlin failed to finish both races: his car suffered an engine failure in the first race while he was running in second and a wheel detached on the opening lap of the second race. Tim Slade and Robert Dahlgren were both eliminated from the weekend after accidents during the two races. McLaughlin bounced back by winning the Sunday race from pole position, ahead of Nick Percat, who scored his first podium finish as a full-time driver, and Fabian Coulthard. Mark Winterbottom was given a drive-through penalty for causing an incident which saw the cars of David Reynolds and Scott Pye suffer significant damage. With Whincup finishing fifth, the end of the weekend saw Whincup leading Winterbottom by 135 points in the championship standings.

Wilson Security Sandown 500

Jamie Whincup and Paul Dumbrell dominated the Wilson Security Sandown 500, securing pole position and leading 150 of the 161 laps on their way to victory. The two Holden Racing Team cars filled the podium, with James Courtney and Greg Murphy finishing ahead of Garth Tander and Warren Luff. Mark Winterbottom fell to third in the championship standings behind Craig Lowndes, after Winterbottom and Steve Owen could only finish tenth while Lowndes and Steven Richards finished fourth. Lee Holdsworth had a high-speed crash when his car suffered a mechanical failure at the end of the back straight, resulting in heavy contact with the tyre barrier. A wheel was torn off in the accident, which was collected by Jason Bright, forcing he and Andrew Jones out of the race. The only other retirement was the car of James Moffat and Taz Douglas, whose car was retired when the team were unable to disconnect the fuel hose from the car during their first pit stop.

Supercheap Auto Bathurst 1000

Ford Performance Racing won its second consecutive Bathurst 1000, with Chaz Mostert and Paul Morris taking victory, from last place on the grid, over James Moffat and Taz Douglas, driving for Nissan Motorsport, and Nick Percat and Oliver Gavin, driving for James Rosenberg Racing. Jamie Whincup, driving with Paul Dumbrell, led for most of the final lap but ran out of fuel at Forrest's Elbow and dropped to fifth. The pole-sitting car of Shane van Gisbergen and Jonathon Webb were in contention until van Gisbergen stalled in the final pit stop and the car would not restart. Other leading contenders had various issues throughout the day. Scott McLaughlin and Alexandre Prémat led the most laps but were forced out of contention when McLaughlin hit the wall after being passed by van Gisbergen. Craig Lowndes received a drive-through penalty for spinning Mark Winterbottom in the closing stages, with the two cars finishing tenth and sixth respectively. David Reynolds and Dean Canto had an alternator failure while running second. The Holden Racing Team had a difficult weekend, with the car of Garth Tander and Warren Luff being withdrawn from the event after a major crash in Saturday practice, while James Courtney and Greg Murphy suffered electrical problems throughout the race. The race was the longest in history at seven hours and fifty-eight minutes, including a one-hour red flag period in the middle of the race to enable track repairs to be carried out. Despite finishing fifth, Whincup extended his championship lead with Winterbottom overtaking Lowndes for second place.

Castrol Edge Gold Coast 600

The Gold Coast 600 saw Jamie Whincup further extend his championship lead. Whincup and co-driver Paul Dumbrell finished runner-up in the Saturday race before going on to win the Sunday race. Shane van Gisbergen and Jonathon Webb won from pole on Saturday but incurred a drive-through penalty in the Sunday race and finished fifth. Tony D'Alberto, Alexandre Prémat and Dean Fiore all scored their first podium finish in V8 Supercars during the weekend, with D'Alberto and Tim Slade finishing third on Saturday, while Prémat and Scott McLaughlin finished second on Sunday ahead of Fiore and Michael Caruso. The Sunday result also saw the second podium finish of the season for Nissan. Whincup's championship rivals had difficult weekends, with Mark Winterbottom being relegated from the podium on Saturday after bumping and passing Slade at the final corner and suffering an engine problem late in the Sunday race before being spun by Russell Ingall. Craig Lowndes suffered damage in the Saturday race and finished eighteenth and was hurt by strategy on Sunday. With Chaz Mostert and Paul Morris struggling during the weekend, Whincup and Dumbrell easily secured the Endurance Cup.

Plus Fitness Phillip Island 400

Jamie Whincup secured a record-breaking sixth championship at Phillip Island, with a third place and a victory in the Saturday races giving him an unassailable points lead with four races remaining. Scott McLaughlin won the first of the Saturday races ahead of Craig Lowndes and Whincup, while Whincup's closest championship rival, Mark Winterbottom, finished twenty-fourth after going off the circuit. Winterbottom recovered to finish third behind Whincup and Lowndes in the second race, his first podium finish since Hidden Valley. Shane van Gisbergen and Fabian Coulthard endured a difficult day after a collision in qualifying damaged both of their cars, causing them to start from the back of the grid for both races. Garth Tander was on course to take victory in the Sunday race before running out of fuel coming out of the final corner, allowing McLaughlin to take the win. Tander finished second ahead of Winterbottom and Whincup.

Sydney NRMA 500

The final round of the championship was affected by storms in and around Sydney, with heavy rain causing two of the three races to be stopped just after half distance. Former series champion Marcos Ambrose returned to the series as a wildcard entry, having last competed in 2005. Ambrose and Craig Lowndes crashed in the first qualifying session. The resulting red flag gave Erebus Motorsport its first pole position, with Will Davison going quickest ahead of Jamie Whincup. Whincup won the first race in dry conditions ahead of Tim Slade and David Reynolds. Despite starting fourth in the second race, Whincup took the lead at the first corner from polesitter Jason Bright. The race was red-flagged after 19 of the 37 laps due to heavy rain before being restarted under safety car conditions to allow the field to complete enough laps for full championship points to be awarded. Shane van Gisbergen and Scott McLaughlin rounded out the podium with Bright in fourth. McLaughlin took his tenth pole position of the season for the Sunday race but could only manage to finish eighth. Conditions similar to those in the second race caused another red flag after 44 of the 74 laps. The race was eventually abandoned and van Gisbergen was declared the winner ahead of Garth Tander and James Courtney. The result saw van Gisbergen take second in the championship ahead of Mark Winterbottom and Lowndes.

Championship standings

Points system
Points were awarded for each race at an event, to the driver/s of a car that completed at least 75% of the race distance and was running at the completion of the race, up to a maximum of 300 points per event.

Short format: Used for the 100 km races of Super Sprint events (excluding Auckland) and the 125 km races of Super Street events.
Long format: Used for the 200 km races of Super Sprint events, the 250 km race of Super Street events and in both races of the Gold Coast 600.
Auckland format: Used for the 100 km races of the ITM 500 Auckland.
Endurance format: Used for the Sandown 500 and Bathurst 1000 endurance races.

Drivers' Championship

Notes:
 – Wildcard entry ineligible for championship points.

Pirtek Endurance Cup

Teams' Championship

Notes:
‡ — Denotes a single-car team.

Footnotes

See also
V8 Supercars
2014 V8 Supercar season

References

Supercars Championship seasons
International V8
International V8